The Story of Princess Zeineb and King Leopard (French: Histoire de la Princesse Zeineb et du Roi Léopard) is a French language fairy tale published in the 18th century. The tale belongs to the international cycle of the Animal as Bridegroom as a subtype, with few variants reported across Europe.

Sources
The tale was published by abbot and preacher Jean-Paul Bignon in the work Les Aventures d'Abdalla, fils d'Hanif, tome 2. The tale was translated as The History of Princess Zeineb and the King Leopard by Henry Weber.

Summary
Princess Zeineb narrates her tale in first person: she is the youngest of six daughters of King Batoche, who rules the eastern part of the Isle of Gilolo. One day, her father finds a palace in a part of the island. He enter, but a voice forbids him, threatening to kill him unless he delivers one of his daughters. The king returns to tell his daughters about the event, and they see a leopard with a ferocious glare in his eyes. That same day, the leopard appears at court; every daughter tries to gather some courage to offer herself to the leopard, but only Zeineb decides to bear the burden of her father's decision.

Zeineb goes to the leopard's palace and admires the extravagance. She is served by nymphs and the leopard is no animal, but shows great wisdom and respect for Zeineb. And so they live together in the palace. However, ten months into their domestic arrangement, Zeineb begins to suspect that the leopard may be more than he seems. One night, she notices that there is someone in bed with her, and the leopard skin is strewn about on the floor. Zeineb decides to tear the animal skin to pieces and goes back to bed.

Her mysterious bedmate wakes up the next day and despairs at the torn leopard fur. He reveals he is a king, enchanted by an evil magician. Zeineb tries to explain herself. The leopard begins to calm down and teaches her a magical spell to command people. Then, the princess notices that the palace and everything has disappeared. She finds some of her previous clothes, now in tatters, puts them on and decides to beg for food and work in the world. She meets a Mussulman trader who is travelling to Borneo, and embarks on his ship.

They reach Borneo and she disembarks. After walking to deeper parts of the island, the princess moves to the city of Soucad, where she decides to take up the job of seamstress. Her business thrives and she gains enough money to hire help and buy a larger studio. Due to her successes, three local men decide to try their luck in wooing her. The first of the would be seducers dines with Zeineb. The princess thinks of a ploy to get rid of him: she has a window in her apartment that the first suitor goes to shut, and the princess uses the magical command to glue him to the window until the morning. Similar incidents happen to the other two wooers.

Their passion for the princess turns to hatred and they report her to a judge, a magician. Zeineb manages to delay her trial for three months by bribing local magistrates, but she is still sentenced to be burnt alive. She is walked to her execution and the executioner prepared to deal the fatal blow, when he stays still - Zeineb is the one who paralyzed the executioner with the magical spell. The three suitors seize the opportunity to their favour and incite the populace. Suddenly, a great sound of acclamation is heard in the mob: the king of Soucad, their monarch, has returned, and wished to surprise his people. He halts the execution and releases the princess. After some moments taking in the visage of her saviour, she recognizes that the king of Soucad is the Leopard.

The king of Soucad, the same leopard, marries Zeineb and tells her the whole story: he is the legitimate heir to the throne, but his brother conspired  with a magician to turn him into an animal. A sage, however, mitigated the curse by establishing an escape clause: if a princess was willing to spend a whole year with him, the curse would be lifted.

Analysis

Tale type
The tale has been compared to the Graeco-Roman myth of Cupid and Psyche, by Apuleius, in that a human heroine marries a supernatural or animal husband and loses him, having to search for him. As such, it is classified, in the international Aarne-Thompson-Uther Index, as tale type ATU 425, "The Search for the Lost Husband".

French scholars Paul Delarue and Marie-Louise Thénèze, establishers of the French folktale catalogue, classified it as subtype 425N. In subtype AaTh 425N, "Bird Husband", after losing her husband, the heroine finds work somewhere else and has to avoid the romantic advances of unwanted suitors. According to Christine Goldberg, the heroine enchants the servants to be kept busy with some other task for the whole night.

In his monograph about Cupid and Psyche, Swedish scholar  proposed that subtype 425N derived from a type he designated as 425A, that is, "Cupid and Psyche", which contains the episode of the witch's tasks. Also, the crow is the supernatural husband's form in Northern European variants, but in all of them the heroine receives a magical token from her husband: either a feather from the bird husband, or a ring.

Variants
According to scholar Christine Goldberg, Swahn reported 17 variants of subtype 425N across Europe, in Ireland, Britain, Germany, Italy, Spain and France.

Europe

Germany 
The Brothers Grimm, in their notes, mentioned a tale collected in Hanover. In this tale, a king hunts some game to cure his three ill daughters. He sights in the forest a raven and aims at it, but the raven strikes a deal with him: the bird shall find him some game, in exchange or one of the king's daughters to be given to the bird as wife. The raven fulfills his promise, and waits for the king to fulfill his. He cures his daughters and asks if one of them is willing to go to the raven. The youngest agrees and takes her waiting maid with her. The raven takes the princess and the waiting maid to a castle, where the princess spends her days. She has a mirror in her room, which she must not let the waiting maid peer into. She accidentally forgets to lock her room and her waiting maid looks into the mirror. The raven scolds her and tells she must go into service for seven years, perform the work of seven maids. The raven gives her one of its feathers and teaches her a spell. The princess leaves the castle, trades clothes with an old woman, and finds work in a house. The mistress of the house forces her on the workload of seven maids. During the seven years, the male servants of the house, one by one, try to woo her, but she uses the raven's feather and spell to humiliate them, so she remains faithful to the raven for seven years.

Folklorist Franz Xaver von Schönwerth collected in the 19th century a Bavarian variant titled Der verwünschene Krähe ("The Enchanted Crow"), published in the 21st century with the title The Enchanted Quill. In this tale, a man falls from his horse and passes out in the middle of the forest. He wakes up and sees a crow pecking at his horse. The man inquires the bird about the meaning of his action, and the crow answers he is just awakening the man, who has been asleep for three years. The crow asks one of the man's three sisters as reward and gives a picture to the man to show the sisters. The elder two wrinkle their noses at the image, but the youngest agrees to marry the bird. The family is escorted in a golden carriage to a large palace and warned to get too curious and peek into what they should not. The youngest sister enters a room and talks to the crow. Her sisters peek through the keyhole and see a prince instead of the bird. The castle disappears and the crow says only the youngest can save him, but she must dress in rags and look for a job in a nearby town. The youngest sister follows the bird's orders and finds work as the servant to a prince, but her work is dismal. To help her, the bird asks her to pluck a father from his body and use it to fulfill any task. Her work improves and she draws the attention of three of the prince's servants (the caretaker, the huntsman and a "dove-watcher"), who each try to court her. With the crow's feather and a magic command, she humiliates each of them: the caretaker spends a whole evening opening and closing a door; the huntsman puts his boots on and takes them off all night, and the dove-watcher closes and opens the door to the dovecote all night.

In a German variant from Silesia with the title Die erlöste Schlange ("The redeemed snake"), published by German folklorist , a woodcutter is told by a litle gray man to give him his elder daughter to save him. The next day, a snake comes and takes the girl to its lair, then changes into the little gray man, and says the girl can help disenchant him if she keeps reading a book for seven days on end, without taking her eyes off the book. For six days, she manages to stay awake and the snake becomes a prince. On the seventh, however, the girl's sisters come for a visit, and distract her. The prince turns back into a snake, and tells the girl she needs to go out in the forest and find work in a beautiful castle. Then he gives her a feather that will help her. The girl goes to the castle and finds work. She uses the feather and a magical command to unload a cart of fertilizer. At the end of the tale, after working in the castle, the girl gets to marry the prince, who is no longer a snake.

England 
In an English tale published by folklorist Joseph Jacobs with the title Three Feathers, a woman is married to a man whose face she has never seen. One night, while he is asleep by her side, the woman lights a torch and discovers her husband is a handsome man. The man turns into a bird, tells her she has to serve seven years and a day, gives her three feathers and teaches a spell for her to use. The woman leaves her home and finds work in another house as a laundry-maid. The other male servants - the butler, the coachman, and the footman - begin to notice her and intend to court her. Their efforts to impress her fail, because the woman makes up some excuse so that the male servant can do a chivalrous deed for her: by the use of the feather and the spell, the footman is stuck trying to close the shutters that keep opening; the coachman tries to gather the woman's clothes from the cloth's hanger, and a wind blows them about all night; the coachman goes to the cellar to get some brandy for her, and the contents from the barrels keep spilling out.

Ireland 
In an Irish tale collected by Pádraig Ó Tuathail from County Carlow and County Wicklow with the title The Enchanted King and Queen, a prince becomes bewitched to be a crow for seven years. When he flies in crow form, he sights a royal couple and their horses bogged in the mud. The crow-prince offers to help, in exchange for the royal couple's daughter. The royal parents agree and the crow helps them. The princess, named Nancy, meets her crow fiancé, who turns into a handsome man. He asks her which form she prefers him to be; she answers that she wants him as a man by night. And so they marry and move out to a palace of their own. One day, the crow prince warns her to protect a cask of gold and not give it to a witch that will come after it, no matter the cost. This it happens: a witch appears and demands the cask, but the princess refuses to give it. The witch comes back the next day and fails again. On the third day, she appears with two teeth and two walking sticks, captures the princess and steals the cask of gold, to the crow prince's misfortune. Nancy cries over the broken promise, but the crow prince has a plan: he advises her to seek employment with the old witch, gives her three feathers of his tail and teaches her a spell to fulfill every wish she may have. Nancy goes to the old witch's house and offers her services as a maid. She washes and dries the clothes, feeds the horses - all with the magic command her husband taught her. At the end of the afternoon, a servant lad wishes to stay with Nancy all night, but the asks him a favor: for him to close the duck-house door for her. The servant lad goes and Nancy chants the magical spell to have the lad lock the duck-house door all night. The next day, Nancy uses the magical spell on another servant: this time, he stays up all night just raking and raking the fire. The third time, she commands a third servant lad to lock the fowl-house door all night, for fire to come out of his mouth and for him to go round the yard like a devil. Some time later, fed up with the humiliation, the three servants lad prepare a trap for Nancy in the woods, but she learns of this and uses the magical command to compel the trio to beat one another. The old witch appears to see the commotion and Nancy alters the command and compels the lads to strike the witch. The hag begs for Nancy to save her, and the princess agrees, so long as she returns the cask of gold to her.

In a tale published by author Seumas MacManus with the title Feather O' My Wing, a magpie lands on a rich gentleman's shoulders. The man tries to shoo it away, but lets the bird perch on his shoulder and talks to it. The magpie answers that he is an enchanted prince. The man asks what he can do to help him, and the magpie replies that if he can marry one of the man's daughters, his enchantment can be broken. The gentleman takes the magpie with him to his house and talks to his three daughters. The elder two refuse to entertain the magpie, but the youngest, named Una, decides to help the bird. After the man and the elder daughters leave, the girls spy on Una being courted by a handsome man instead of the bird. The sisters become jealous. Una and the prince marry and depart to his castle. The elder sister decides to visit their new home, but the prince warns that his castle is filled with rare and beautiful things; if anyone were to covet them, he would revert to a magpie for another seven years. Some time later, Una's elder sister promises not to covet anything. During her visit, however, the elder sister mutters to herself she wants to have a certain golden plate of her brother-in-law's collection, and the prince turns back into a magpie. His wife, Una, asks the prince what she can do. The prince replies that she is to go to the mansion of the White Lady and work as a laundress, but she must not ask for money, and let her employer, the White Lady, place her wages in a drawer. The magpie also gives her a feather of his wing and teaches her a spell: "By the feather of his wing". And so it happens: Una works for the White Lady, and uses the feather and the spell to do her chores. Eventually, her exceptional work arises suspicions among the other female servants. One night, a waitress creeps into Una's room to cut off her red curls (spurred by Una's sarcastic retort), but Una - pretending to be asleep - commands her to do her chores all night. This repeats with a lady gardener and a lady coachman. After humiliating both servants, the White Lady gathers all of her servants and orders them to arm themselves with sticks and prepare to beat Una as soon as she leaves the house. After the seven years are up, Una prepares to leave the mansion, since she saw her husband arriving in a coach, but the White Lady and her servants approach her. Una uses the magic command to have the White Lady and the servants beat themselves up.

Italy 
In an Italian variant collected by author Italo Calvino with the title The Man Who Came Out Only at Night (Italian: L'uomo che usciva solo di notte), a poor fisherman has three daughters. One day, a mysterious suitor that comes out only at night comes to court any of his daughters. Only the third agrees to be the man's bride. They marry and he reveals his secret: he is cursed to be a man by night and a tortoise by day; the only way to break the curse is for him to marry, but leave his wife to travel the world, and his wife must remain faithful and endure hardships for his sake. His wife agrees to help him, and he gives her a magic diamond ring. He becomes a tortoise and departs, while the girl goes to look for work. She finds a mother trying to make her son laugh, and the girl uses the ring on him; the baby dances, laughs and frolics. Later, she comes to a bakery and uses the magic ring to make the bakery prosper while she is working there. Her work draws the attention of three suitors. The first man offers her money to spend a night with her; she uses the magic ring to make him knead bread dough for a whole night. The second man also offers her money; she rebuffs him by magically forcing him to blow the fire all night. The same happens to the third man: by the use of the ring, he spends the whole night shutting a door. The three scorned men warn the authorities and some policemen and woman come to take the baker's assistant away. The girl uses the power of the ring and makes them beat each other up. The tortoise comes out of the sea and turns into a man for good.

Spain 
In Spain, the narrative is indexed as type AaTh 425N, La burla a los galanteadores ("Mocking the would-be suitors").

In a Catalan language tale titled Es mel·loro rosso, a king has a sick daughter named N'Elienoreta, and the only cure for her is the “Es mel·loro rosso" that belongs to a king named Rei Tortuga (King Turtle). Rei Tortuna agress to help the girl, in exchange for her marrying him. It happens thus, and N'Elienoreta is given the keys to his castle, with an order never to open a certain door. The girl's stepmother, however, visits her step-daughter, steals the keys and, while she is asleep, opens the forbidden door. Rei Tortuga, enraged at this betrayal, orders his majordomo, named N'Amet, to kill the girl and bring back her blood as proof of his deed. N'Amet disobeys the orders and spares N'Elienoreta, giving her a magic book and teaching her a spell she can use with it, then departs. The girl uses the book to create a palace bigger than Rei Tortuga's, who sends some servants to investigate it. N'Elienoreta invites each of the servants in, and asks if they could help her close the windows and doors. The servant goes to the window, and N'Elienoreta summons a fierce gust of wind to open the doors and windows, which the servants keep trying to close. Another variant was published by author Jordi des Racó (pen name of Antoni Maria Alcover i Sureda) in 1913, in newspaper , wherein the heroine is given the magic book by a fairy. Catalan scholar  recognized the tale as a variant of type AaTh 425N.

In a Spanish tale collected by folklorist Aurelio Macedonio Espinosa Sr. with the title Las tres ascuitas, an old woman has three daughters and gathers herbs for their three hares. One day, she pulls a herb from the ground and a male voice complains the woman is pulling his hair. The male voice asks the woman to bring his elder daughter to him. She does, and the elder daughters lives in an enchanted palace with a mysterious husband she cannot see. One day, the little birds are singing, and the mysterious man tells his wife his sister is marrying and allows her to visit them, but she must return pronto. Later, the little birds are crying, which the man explains his wife's youngest sister is dying, and she is allowed to visit them. The girl goes back home and spends some time with her mother, who gives her a candle so she can see her husband at night. The girl returns home to the mysterious husband and, while he is asleep, she lights up the candle and sees his true face: a man with a medallion on his chest and a washerwoman washing some rags. She shouts for the washerwoman and the man awakes. He says he has been disenchanted, gives his wife three hot embers ('ascuitas') and a wand of virtue for her to use it whenever she needs, then vanishes. The girl suddenly appears with a palace in the middle of a city, and the people think she is evil. In the same city live three male friends who want to see who is living in the palace. The first one goes to the palace and asks if one can lunch there. The girl aswers one can have lunch, have dinner and later sleep with her, which greatly satisfies him. However, as soon as the man prepares to sleep with her, the girl requests the man to fetch some water from the well, and, while he is at the well, she uses the magic wand of virtue and commands the man to pour water over himself for the whole night. The man goes home and his friend tries to seduce the girl, and again the girl uses the wand of virtue to have the man's nose be glued to the mirror the whole night. Finally, the third man tries to court the girl, and she uses the wand of virtue to have the man stuck to the door hinges for the whole night. After being humiliated, the three men report her to the authorities and some guards come to arrest her. The girl takes the ascuitas and her prince appears to her. He explains to the guards his wife is not an evil person, and marries her.

Americas

Chile 
In a Chilean tale collected by Chilean folklorist  with the title Ramoncita, an old man lives with his three daughters Rosita, Juanita and Ramoncita. One day, the man passes by a swamp and a little frog asks the man to marry one of his daughters. The man goes back home and questions his daughters which shall marry the frog: the elder two refuse, but Ramoncita agrees and she marries the frog. When the old man goes out for a while, the frog tells Ramoncita he is to sleep by her side wrapped in a handkerchief, and he must be undisturbed until midnight for him to fully become a man. However, Juanita and Rosita enter her sister's room and mock her for sleeping with an animal on her bed. The frog wakes up and feels insulted that Ramoncita's sisters interrupted him, so the girl can only find him across the sea, so gives her a magic kerchief, and vanishes. Ramoncita decides to look for him and goes to the seashore, then uses the magic kerchief to open up a dry path for her until she reaches a city, where she rents a house from two old ladies. The ladies also find has a companion named Chinita. In the city, there are three priests, each of them pays a visit to Ramoncita and Chinita: the first priest compliments Ramoncitas guitar playing, and she uses the magic kerchief to have the priest play the guitar all night. The second priest comes and is served a glass of water, and Ramoncita uses the kerchief to have the second priest drink water all night. Lastly, the third priest comes and is served a cup of tea, who Ramoncita enchants to drink all night long. Some time later, the three priests take Ramoncita, Chinita and the old ladies to court, and are further humiliated by Ramoncita enchanting them to chase after the mules.

See also
 Beauty and the Beast
 The Green Serpent
 Graciosa and Percinet
 The Crow (fairy tale)

Footnotes

References 

French fairy tales
Fictional princes
Fictional princesses
Fictional leopards
Fictional Indonesian people
Fiction about shapeshifting
Female characters in fairy tales
ATU 400-459